Halfway to Hazard is an American country music duo composed of singer-songwriters David Tolliver and Chad Warrix. Though Tolliver and Warrix grew up in different towns in southeastern Kentucky, their band's origins are in Hazard, Kentucky, which was halfway between their hometowns. The duo has helped to raise over one million dollars for Kentucky based charities plus another million in conjunction with various Tennessee, Florida and Texas charities.

Biography
Their debut single, "Daisy", was a Top 40 hit on the U.S. Billboard Hot Country Songs charts in 2007. The song was also featured as iTunes' single of the week on August 6, 2007. In addition, they toured as Tim McGraw and Faith Hill's opening act on their Soul2Soul 2007 Tour. McGraw helped to produce the album.

On October 14, 2007, the duo performed the national anthem prior to the Green Bay Packers' home game against the Washington Redskins. Later that season they performed again at Lambeau Field for the Packers NFC Championship game against the New York Giants.

In May 2008, they were nominated by the Academy of Country Music for the Duo of the Year award. Halfway to Hazard toured again on the Live Your Voice tour with Tim McGraw and Jason Aldean.

The duo created the "Halfway to Hazard Charity Concert and Trailride" later simply renamed "Crockettsville." (Crockettsville, KY is located near Chad Warrix's hometown) The annual event from 2008 to 2014 featured various friends of Chad and David/music entertainers as Chris Young, Lee Brice, Randy Houser, Lit, Tim McGraw, Dierks Bentley, Montgomery Gentry, Keith Anderson, Ray Scott and many more. The multi-day event/festival included a 40+ mile off road atv ride and an outdoor concert along with miscellaneous carnival attractions and extreme motocross trick teams. The event's proceeds were given to various local charities mostly involving children and education. Other notable celebrities included, motocross legend- Ricky Carmichael, race car driver- Kyle Petty, Sirius XM's- Storme Warren.

A single from their second album, "I Know Where Heaven Is," was released on July 20, 2009. The album, Come on Time, was released on October 19, 2009. Neither charted.

The duo took an official hiatus from 2011 to 2014 . During this time, Warrix toured as lead guitarist for with Randy Houser and also Keith Anderson.

Warrix released a solo music video, "Rain on the Roof," in 2012, featuring former All Pro NFL Tennessee Titan's kicker, Rob Bironas.

Tolliver now writes full-time for Curb music publishing and formerly of Tim McGraw's publishing company, StyleSonic. He and Warrix had one song, "Die by My Own Hand," on McGraw's Emotional Traffic album and Tolliver has the song "Let Me Love It Out of You" on McGraw's Two Lanes of Freedom album. Brantley Gilbert, Jerrod Niemann, Chris Young, Edwin McCain, Cade Foehner, Wynonna Judd, Tim Montana, Neal McCoy, and many others have also recorded Tolliver's songs. Halfway to Hazard released two singles for purchase on iTunes via their own Picnic Hill Label. "Heaven On Down the Highway" and "American Outlaw" respectively. Their album "REDemption" was released in 2017 on their own Picnic Hill Records imprint, as was "Live at Analog" in 2019.

Discography

Albums

Singles

Music videos

External links
Label Site
Official Site

References

Country music duos
Country music groups from Kentucky
Mercury Records artists
Musical groups established in 2007
Musical groups disestablished in 2010
2007 establishments in Kentucky
2010 disestablishments in Kentucky